Creola is an incorporated village in Grant Parish, Louisiana, United States. It was incorporated on January 23, 2002, under the provisions of the Lawrason Act. An incorporation election was held in October 2000 with 36 people (97.3%) voting in favor of the measure and 1 (2.7%) voting against. As of the 2010 census, Creola had a population of 213.

Creola is located in the southern portion of Grant Parish and is part of the Alexandria Metropolitan Statistical Area.

Education
Creola residents are zoned to Grant Parish School Board schools.

Economy

Jena Choctaw Pines Casino

The Jena Choctaw Pines Casino opened on February 13, 2013. It will be a Class II casino under Indian Gaming laws. It is the first phase of the casino project that features  of gaming space containing 700 slots and a poker room, and also featuring a sport bar and a buffet. The revenue collected from the casino will help the Jena Band of Choctaws fulfill unmet needs for housing, education, and health care. This will be the third casino in the central Louisiana area.

According to the casino's general manager, John Neumann, future expansion of the casino was expected within at least six months. The next phase of the project was to include expanding the gaming area and restaurant nearly doubling the space, meeting spaces to the main building, and a hotel. The overall master plan is to also include a RV park, an entertainment venue, and a strip mall.

Geography
Creola is located along the southern border of Grant Parish, adjacent to Rapides to the south. U.S. Route 167 runs through the village, leading south  to Alexandria and north  to Winnfield.

Demographics

As of 2010, the population of Creola was 213 with 80 households which 65% are owned, 30% are rented, and 5% are unoccupied. The median household income is $44,499. 62% of the population are married couples with 44% of them have children. Males make up 48% of the total population while females make up the other 52%.

References

External links

Jena Choctaw Pines Casino

Villages in Louisiana
Villages in Grant Parish, Louisiana
Populated places established in 2002
Alexandria metropolitan area, Louisiana